Huehuetla may refer to:
 the municipality of Huehuetla, Hidalgo, or its municipal seat of the same name
 the municipality of Huehuetla, Puebla, or its municipal seat of the same name